The WAGR U class was a class of 4-6-2 steam locomotives operated by the Western Australian Government Railways (WAGR) between 1946 and the late 1960s. One was rebuilt as a 4-6-4 tank locomotive.

History

In 1942, the North British Locomotive Company built 55 locomotives for the British War Department. They were almost identical to the 220 class of the Sudan Railways. The new locomotives were intended to be available for use on various  gauge railways operated by the Sudan, Nigerian, Gold Coast, Belgian Congo, French Ocean Congo and Rhodesian Railways, depending upon the course of the World War II battles in North Africa. Unlike the 220 class, which burned coal, the new locomotives were equipped as oil burners, although they had provision for rapid conversion to coal burning, if necessary.

Of the 55 new locomotives, 35 were sent overseas in 1942 and 1943. The remaining 20 were stored unassembled in England at the Melbourne Military Railway near Derby. In 1946, six of these went to the Nyasaland Railways for use on the Trans-Zambesi Railway, and the other 14 were sent to Western Australia, where they became the WAGR U class entering service between November 1946 and April 1947.

Classified as the U class, they operated passenger and freight services between Perth, Albany and Bunbury. Following the delivery of the X class they were relegated to lesser freight services. By 1957, with their running costs being three times greater than that of coal powered locomotives, they were stored. Five were returned to service in 1961 during a coal shortage before being withdrawn again shortly after. Further brief comebacks were made in 1966 and 1967.

In 1957, U664 was converted to a 4-6-4 tank locomotive at the Midland Railway Workshops to allow it to maintain the faster schedules on Perth suburban services introduced when ADG class railcars were placed in service. Although deemed a success, no more followed due to its high operating costs. After being stored, it returned in 1966 to haul ballast trains on the Midland and South Western lines.

Class list
The numbers and periods in service of each member of the U class were as follows:

See also

Rail transport in Western Australia
List of Western Australian locomotive classes

References

Notes

Bibliography

 Chapter 30.

External links

NBL locomotives
Railway locomotives introduced in 1946
U WAGR class
3 ft 6 in gauge locomotives of Australia
4-6-2 locomotives
Passenger locomotives